Helsingborgs HC is a Swedish hockey club based in Helsingborg.  They currently play in group F of Division 1, the third tier of the Swedish ice hockey system.

External links
Official website
Club profile on Eliteprospects.com

Ice hockey teams in Sweden
1977 establishments in Sweden
Sport in Helsingborg
Ice hockey clubs established in 1977
Ice hockey teams in the Øresund Region
Ice hockey teams in Skåne County